Northcote may refer to:

People with the surname
 
 Sir Geoffry Northcote (1881–1948), British colonial administrator
 Hannah Northcote (c.1761–1831), English silversmith
 Henry Northcote (disambiguation)
 James Northcote (1746–1831), British painter
 James Spencer Northcote (1821–1907), English priest and writer
 Percy Northcote (1866–1934), English cricketer

 Stafford Northcote, 1st Earl of Iddesleigh (1818–1887), British politician
 Stafford Harry Northcote, Viscount Saint Cyres (1869–1926), diplomat and historian

 Walter Northcote, 2nd Earl of Iddesleigh (1845–1927)

Places
 Northcote, Devon, a location in England
 Northcote, Langho, a hotel and restaurant in Lancashire, England
 Northcote, Auckland, a suburb of Auckland, New Zealand 
Northcote Central
Northcote Tigers, a rugby league club
 Northcote, Christchurch, a suburb of Christchurch, New Zealand
 Northcote, Victoria, a suburb of Melbourne, Australia
Northcote City FC
Northcote Football Club
Northcote Park Football Club

Electoral districts
Northcote (New Zealand electorate), an electoral district in New Zealand
Electoral district of Northcote, an electoral district in Victoria, Australia

Other uses
 Northcote Burke, Canadian Anglican priest
 Northcote (steamboat), a steamboat engaged by Gabriel Dumont
 Northcote (band)